Nancy Fulda (née Owens) is an American science fiction writer, editor, and computer scientist. She is an alumna of Brigham Young University in the fields of artificial intelligence and machine learning. She has won multiple awards for her science fiction writing, which has been compared to that of Asimov and Clarke.

Biography
Fulda graduated in 2002 with a bachelor's degree in computer science at Brigham Young University. In 2004, she received a master's degree in the same field, focusing on artificial intelligence and machine learning.

One of her favorite science fiction short stories is Flowers for Algernon, by Daniel Keyes, and she calls it "one of the best science fiction books [she] ever read". Her first award for writing was the 1998 Vera Hinckley Mayhew Award—given out at Brigham Young University—for her short story "The Man Who Murdered Himself". This story was later formally published in 2004 for the first time in The Phobos Science Fiction Anthology Volume 3. Having this story published helped her move toward a career in writing.

Her story "That Undiscovered Country" won the Jim Baen Memorial Short Story Award Grand Prize in 2011, beating "Gemini XVII" by Brad R. Torgersen and "Natural Selection" by Michael Simon. Fulda's 2012 story, "Movement" was partially inspired by her autistic son. It won the Readers' Choice Award from Asimov's Science Fiction, and was nominated for the BSFA, Hugo, and Nebula Awards.

Her writing has been compared to that of Isaac Asimov and Arthur C. Clarke. She draws on her religion, life experiences, and science background when creating her stories. Because of various conversations with fellow writers, she called for tolerance and respect in the science fiction and fantasy writing field for those with religious beliefs. Fulda is active in SFWA and has addressed various topics on the SFWA site as a guest blogger: engaging in online discussions, dealing with awards season, how to create good antagonists, developing effective hooks, writing short and long stories, and carving a finished story from an unfinished idea.
 
Fulda created the Anthology Builder website in 2007 as a way to promote short stories through custom anthologies, though the site closed down in late 2016. She is an adjunct professor in the Computer Science department at Brigham Young University, and she has four children.

Relatives
Fulda's sister is writer Sandra Tayler; her brother-in-law is cartoonist Howard Tayler.

Bibliography
Works are listed in chronological order within each section.

Collections
Dead Men Don't Cry: Science Fiction by Nancy Fulda (February 2011, self-published)
Dead Men Don't Cry: 11 Stories by Nancy Fulda (February 2011, self-published, same content as above with the addition of "Tammi's Garden")
Hexes and Haunts: A Halloween 5-Pack  (October 2011, self-published)
The Breath of Heaven: Stories from Distant Worlds  (May 2012, AnthologyBuilder)
The Death and Rebirth of Anne Bonny (December 2015, self-published)
Contains:  "The Death and Rebirth of Anne Bonny", "Saving Sammy", "All or Nothing", "In the Fading Light of Sundown", "The Cyborg and the Cemetery", and "First Steps"

Series
The Numbers Quartet
"All or Nothing" (2012)
"The Death and Rebirth of Anne Bonny" (2012)
"Godshift" (2012)

Short fiction
 "Tammi's Garden" in TeenAge (date unknown)
 "The Man Who Murdered Himself" (1998), first collected in All the Rage This Year edited by Keith Olexa (September 2004, Phobos Books)
 "Ghost Chimes" in Apex Science Fiction and Horror Digest, #4 edited by Jason Sizemore (December 2005, Apex Publications)
 "All Praise to the Dreamer" in Aegri Somnia edited by Jason Sizemore and Gill Ainsworth (December 2006, Apex Publications)
 "Pastry Run" in Jim Baen's Universe, Volume 1, #4 edited by Eric Flint (December 2006, Baen Books)
 "Blue Ink" in AlienSkin Magazine (2006)
 "The Breath of Heaven" in The Sword Review, Issue 27 (June 2007, Double-Edged Publishing)
 "Monument" in Apex Science Fiction and Horror Digest, #10 edited by Jason Sizemore (October 2007, Apex Publications)
 "Dead Men Don’t Cry" in The Sword Review (2007, Double-Edged Publishing)
 "A New Kind of Sunrise" in Warrior Wisewoman edited by Roby James (June 2008, Norilana Books)
 "In the Halls of the Sky Palace" in Jim Baen's Universe, June 2009 (Baen Books)
 "Hexes and Tooth Decay" in Darwin's Evolutions (October 2009)
 "Backlash" in Asimov's Science Fiction Magazine, September 2010 (Dell Magazines)
 "Knowing Neither Kin Nor Foe" in Beneath Ceaseless Skies, #40 (April 2010)
 "The Scream" in NewMyths.com, Issue 13 (December 2010)
 "Like Rain From Silver Skies" in Basement Stories, Issue #3 (January 2011)
 "Movement" in Asimov's Science Fiction Magazine, March 2011 (Dell Magazines)
 "The Half-Life of Chocolate" (April 2011, Fae Publishing)
 "That Undiscovered Country" (2011, Baen.com)
 "All or Nothing" (January 2012, Daily Science Fiction)
 "The Death and Rebirth of Anne Bonny" (January 2012, Daily Science Fiction)
 "Godshift" (March 2012, Daily Science Fiction)
 "In The Fading Light of Sundown" in Orson Scott Card's InterGalactic Medicine Show, #27 edited by Edmund R. Schubert (March 2012, Hatrack River)
 "A Song of Blackness" in Beneath Ceaseless Skies, #106 edited by Scott H. Andrews (October 2012)
 "A Starscape Slightly Askew" (2012)
 "Dawn, and the Stars" (May 2013, Deorc Enterprise)
 "The Cyborg and the Cemetery" in Twelve Tomorrows edited by Stephen Cass (September 2013, MIT Technology Review)
 "A Soaring Pillar of Brightness" in Beyond the Sun edited by Bryan Thomas Schmidt (August 2013, Fairwood Press)
 Castles in the Sky" in Dark Expanse: Surviving the Collapse edited by Alex Shvartsman and William Snee (March 2014, Deorc Enterprise)
 "Ghost Ship" in Dark Expanse: Surviving the Collapse edited by Alex Shvartsman and William Snee (March 2014, Deorc Enterprise)
 "The Shadow Conspiracy" in Dark Expanse: Surviving the Collapse edited by Alex Shvartsman and William Snee (March 2014, Deorc Enterprise)
 "Deadfall" in Shattered Shields edited by Jennifer Brozek and Bryan Thomas Schmidt (November 2014, Baen Books)
 "Recollection" in Carbide Tipped Pens edited by Eric Choi and Ben Bova (December 2014, Tor Books)
 "Metamorphosis" (July 2015, SF Comet)
 "Saving Sammy" (December 2015, in The Death and Rebirth of Anne Bonny)
 "Angles of Incidence" in Analog Science Fiction and Fact, October 2016 (Dell Magazines)
 "Nexus" (2016, in Humanity 2.0 edited by Alex Shvartsman, Phoenix Pick)
 "Planetbound" (2017, in Chasing Shadows: Visions of Our Coming Transparent World edited by Stephen W. Potts, Tor Books)

Nonfiction and academic

Awards

References

21st-century American novelists
21st-century American women writers
Latter Day Saints from Utah
American science fiction writers
American women novelists
Brigham Young University alumni
Living people
Year of birth missing (living people)